António Nogueira may refer to:

António Nogueira (footballer, born 1951), Portuguese footballer
António Nogueira (footballer, born 1963), Portuguese footballer
António Reymão Nogueira (1909-1987), Portuguese equestrian